is a falling block puzzle video game released by Namco Bandai Games for the Nintendo DSi's DSiWare digital download service. It is a spin-off of the Katamari series. However, it bears little resemblance to the series, resembling Tetris more so. It features similar gameplay to Pac-Attack, another puzzle game created by Namco. It was the first game in the series to appear on a Nintendo platform.

Gameplay
Korogashi Puzzle Katamari Damacy is a falling block puzzle game. The player must stack items up and then drop a katamari, a round object that rolls up items, to sweep them away all at once. It uses the gameplay of Pac-Attack.

Development
Korogashi Puzzle Katamari Damacy was announced on February 18, 2009, and was released on March 25, 2009. It was published by Namco Bandai. It uses the same gameplay mechanics of Pac-Attack, an older puzzle game created by Namco. The game features music created with the vocaloid synthesizer program Hatsune Miku.

Notes

References

External links
Official website 

2009 video games
DSiWare games
Katamari
Japan-exclusive video games
Bandai Namco games
Nintendo DS-only games
Nintendo DS games
Puzzle video games
Video games developed in Japan